Metsä Board Oyj, previously known as M-real Corporation, is a leading European producer of premium fresh fibre paperboards including folding boxboards, food service boards and white kraftliners. It was originally established by G.A. Serlachius, and named Metsä-Serla (Forest Serla). Metsä Board is part of Metsä Group, one of the largest forest industry groups in the world.

On 29 September 2008, M-Real sold four of its paper mills to South African company, Sappi.

Nowadays, Metsä Board focuses on folding boxboards, food service boards and white kraftliners and developing better packaging solutions with less environmental impact. Metsä Board has altogether seven production units in Finland (Kyro, Tako, Simpele, Äänekoski, Kemi, Joutseno, Kaskinen) and one in Sweden (Husum).

In the fall of 2020, Metsä Board announced that it would open a competence center in Äänekoski focusing on cardboard and packaging innovations. In the same factory area, among others, Metsä Group's bioproduct factory, cardboard factory, birch veneer factory, wood-based textile fiber test factory and a test factory producing 3D fiber products, which started in May 2022, operate.

References

External links

GA Serlachius Museum

Companies listed on Nasdaq Helsinki
Pulp and paper companies of Finland
Companies established in 1986
1986 establishments in Finland
Manufacturing companies based in Espoo